Ghug  is a village in Jalandhar district of Punjab State, India. The village is administrated by a Sarpanch who is an elected representative.

Demography
According to the 2011 census of India, Ghuga had 117 houses and a population of 612, comprising 318 males and 294 females. The literacy rate was 67.03%, lower than the state average of 75.84%.  The population of children under the age of 6 years was 57 and the child sex ratio was approximately  1036, higher than state average of 846.

Air travel connectivity 
The closest airport to the village is Sri Guru Ram Dass Jee International Airport.

Villages in Kapurthala

References

External links
  Villages in Kapurthala
 Kapurthala Villages List

Villages in Kapurthala district